List of notable events in music that took place in the year 1968.

Specific locations
1968 in British music
1968 in Norwegian music

Specific genres
1968 in country music
1968 in jazz

Events
January 4 – Guitarist Jimi Hendrix is jailed by Stockholm police after trashing a hotel room during a drunken fist fight with bassist Noel Redding.
January 13 – Johnny Cash records At Folsom Prison live at Folsom State Prison, California.
January 20 – The Who and the Small Faces start with a tour of Australia and New Zealand.
February 1 – Universal Studios offers The Doors $500,000 to star in a feature film, which is never made.
February 4 – The Bee Gees make their American television debut on The Smothers Brothers Comedy Hour.
February 12 – Jimi Hendrix is given an honorary high school diploma from Garfield High School in Seattle, Washington. Hendrix is also given the key to the city.
February 16 – The Beatles, Mike Love, Mia Farrow, Donovan and others travel to India to visit Maharishi Mahesh Yogi at Rishikesh.
February 18 – David Gilmour joins Pink Floyd, replacing founder Syd Barrett, who has checked himself into a psychiatric hospital.
February 21 – McGraw-Hill, Inc., outbids eight other publishers and pays $150,000 for the U.S. rights to Hunter Davies' authorized biography of The Beatles.
February 22 – Florence Ballard of The Supremes is released from her contract with Motown.
February 27 – Doo-wop Singer Frankie Lymon is found dead at his grandmother's house in Harlem, New York, of a heroin overdose.
February 29 – The 10th Annual Grammy Awards are held in Chicago, Los Angeles, Nashville and New York, hosted by Stan Freberg. The Beatles' Sgt. Pepper's Lonely Hearts Club Band wins Album of the Year (the first rock LP to receive the award), while The 5th Dimension's "Up, Up and Away" wins both Record of the Year and Song of the Year. Bobbie Gentry wins Best New Artist.
March 1 – Johnny Cash and June Carter are married in Franklin, Kentucky, with Merle Kilgore as best man.
March 8 – Bill Graham opens the Fillmore East in an abandoned movie theater in New York City.
March 25 – The 58th and final new episode of The Monkees airs on NBC.
March 30 – The Yardbirds record their live album Live Yardbirds at the Anderson Theater.
April 5 – James Brown appears on national television in an attempt to calm feelings of anger in the United States following the assassination of Martin Luther King Jr.
April 6
Pink Floyd announces that Syd Barrett, who was replaced two months earlier amid deteriorating mental health, has officially left the group.
The 13th Eurovision Song Contest is held in the Royal Albert Hall, London. The winning song, Spain's "La, la, la" is sung by Massiel, after Spanish authorities refused to allow Joan Manuel Serrat to perform it in Catalan. The UK finish in second place, just one point behind, with the song "Congratulations" sung by Cliff Richard, which goes on to outsell the winning Spanish entry throughout Europe.
The Open Pibroch Competition of the Scottish Piping Society of London is held at the London Scottish headquarters at Buckingham Gate. First place is won by Robert Brown, for the ninth time in ten years, with a performance of The King's Taxes. Second prize goes to Seamus McNeill of the College of Piping, Glasgow, with The Bells of Perth, third prize to Pipe Major Angus MacDonald of the First Battalion, Scots Guards, with Macfarlane's Gathering, and fourth prize to John MacFadyen with The Battle of Auldern. MacFadyen, however, wins narrowly over Brown in the second big competition, that for the Bratach Gorm, the blue banner of the MacCrimmons.
April 7 – Singer/pianist/songwriter Nina Simone's performance at Westbury Music Fair is dedicated to the late Dr. Martin Luther King Jr. The song "Why? (the king of love is dead)" by Gene Taylor is performed for the first time. The show is partially released on the Emmy nominated album 'Nuff Said! (1968).
April 29 – The rock musical Hair opens on Broadway at the Biltmore Theatre.
May 4 – Mary Hopkin performs on the British TV show Opportunity Knocks. Hopkin catches the attention of model Twiggy, who recommends her to Paul McCartney who will soon sign Hopkin to Apple Records.
May 5 – Buffalo Springfield performs together for the last time in Long Beach, California.
May 7
Aretha Franklin records her live LP Aretha in Paris at the Olympia Theater.
Karlheinz Stockhausen begins composing his fifteen intuitive music works, Aus den sieben Tagen.
May 14 – At a press conference, John Lennon and Paul McCartney introduce the Beatles' new business concept, Apple Corps, Ltd., an entertainment company that included a recording studio, a record label, and clothing store.
May 26 – Blues artist Little Willie John dies in prison after being convicted of manslaughter.
May 30 – The Beatles begin recording The White Album (officially titled, simply, The Beatles). Sessions would span over 4 months, ending on October 14.
June 20
David Ruffin is fired from The Temptations due to his ego and because he began inquiring into the Temptations' financial records, demanding an accounting of the group's money.
Martha Reeves & the Vandellas make their debut at the Copacabana in New York City, winning a rave review in The New York Times. The engagement was recorded but remains in the Motown vaults.
 July – Release in Brazil of the album Tropicália: ou Panis et Circencis by Gilberto Gil, Caetano Veloso and others, with arrangements by Rogério Duprat, inaugurates the Tropicália movement in music.
July 7 – The Yardbirds perform for the last time before disbanding.
July 9–14 – The International Eisteddfod takes place in Llangollen, North Wales
July 18 – Mina presents her Italian white soul hits "Se stasera sono qui" and "Colpo al cuore". The performance is transmitted live without playback from the Auditorio A of the Radiotelevisione Italiana regional headquarters in Naples.
August 1 – Jeff Beck Group releases their album Truth. A seminal work of heavy metal, it incorporates blues and hard rock. It introduced the talents of Rod Stewart and Ronnie Wood.
August 4 – Yes performs for the first time, at a summer camp.
August 5–10 – The Royal National Eisteddfod takes place in Barry, Wales.
August 21 – Warsaw Pact invasion of Czechoslovakia. At this evening's performance of The Proms in London, the USSR Symphony Orchestra plays with Mstislav Rostropovich as soloist in Dvořák's Cello Concerto.
August 23 – Simon & Garfunkel give a live concert at the Hollywood Bowl, Hollywood, California. A recording is later released on CD in 1994 by Australian company Vigotone Records as Voices of Intelligent Dissent.
September 7 – Led Zeppelin performs for the first time, billed as The New Yardbirds (the Yardbirds had disbanded two months earlier, and guitarist Jimmy Page has subsequently formed this new group). Also this day, The Banana Splits Adventure Hour premieres on NBC.
September 14 – Two sons of singer Roy Orbison, 10-year-old Roy DeWayne Orbison and 6-year-old Anthony King Orbison, die in a house fire in Hendersonville, Tennessee. Orbison's youngest son, Wesley, is miraculously saved by Roy's parents.
September 15
Song of Summer, Ken Russell's noted TV documentary about Frederick Delius, is shown for the first time as part of the BBC's Omnibus series.
PocketDiscs are released in several test markets in the United States.
September 19 – The Who begin recording Tommy, a rock opera that tells the story about a deaf, dumb and blind boy, including his experiences with life and the relationship with his family.
October 7 – Jose Feliciano at Tiger Stadium for 1968 World Series in Detroit sing a personal and controversial soul version of "Star-Spangled Banner", this was the first time for the National Anthem in a different style.
October 8 – The soundtrack for the 1968 film Romeo and Juliet is released, containing popular "What Is a Youth" tune.
November 8 – John and Cynthia Lennon are divorced.
November 11 – Three days after his divorce, John Lennon and Yoko Ono's experimental album Unfinished Music No. 1: Two Virgins is released in the United States. Noted for its cover photographs of the couple naked, it ends up being a flop.
November 17 – Diana Ross & The Supremes replace The Beatles' hugely successful "Hey Jude" at number-one in the U.S. with "Love Child"; this would be the last of five turnovers at number-one between the two most successful music acts in America during the 1960s.
November 22 – The Beatles (also known as "The White Album") by The Beatles is released. Also released is The Kinks Are the Village Green Preservation Society by The Kinks.
November 26 – Cream plays their farewell concert at the Royal Albert Hall in London. It will be the last time Eric Clapton, Jack Bruce, and Ginger Baker play together until their 1993 induction into the Rock and Roll Hall of Fame.
December 2
Jimi Hendrix's manager Chas Chandler quits over differences with Hendrix during the recording of Electric Ladyland
Janis Joplin and Big Brother and the Holding Company perform their last concert together before Janis goes solo.
December 3 – The 50-minute television special Elvis (sponsored by sewing machine manufacturer The Singer Company), taped in June with a live audience in Burbank, California, airs on NBC in the United States marking the comeback of Elvis Presley after 7 years during which the legendary rock and roll musician's career has centered on the movie industry. Concluding with the premiere of "If I Can Dream", it is not only the highest rated television show for the week of broadcast, but the highest rated television special of the year.
December 6 – The Rolling Stones release Beggars Banquet, which contains the classic song "Sympathy for the Devil."
December 9
A political confrontation at the Planten un Blomen Hall in Hamburg results in cancellation of the scheduled premiere of Hans Werner Henze's oratorio Das Floß der Medusa, a score dedicated to Che Guevara.
TCB airs on NBC starring Diana Ross & the Supremes and The Temptations, becoming the first variety special in America to feature an exclusively African American cast.
Shinjuku Music Festival is broadcast for the first time by Nippon Cultural Broadcasting.
December 11 – The Rolling Stones Rock and Roll Circus is filmed. Acts include The Rolling Stones, The Who, Taj Mahal, Jethro Tull, The Dirty Mac and Marianne Faithfull. This is the last appearance of Brian Jones as a member of the Rolling Stones.
December 20 – Peter Tork announces he is leaving The Monkees.
December 22 – The Animals reunite for one benefit concert at the Newcastle City Hall while Eric Burdon & The Animals are disbanding.
December 31 – Small Faces break up when Steve Marriott storms off the stage.
Undated – Tropicália movement in Brazil ends.

Bands formed

Amon Düül II
Bearsden Choir (founded)
Black Sabbath (as Earth)
The Brooklyn Bridge
Can
Colosseum
Crosby, Stills & Nash
Deep Purple
Fitzwilliam Quartet
Free
Henry Cow
Jacula
King Crimson
Led Zeppelin (as The New Yardbirds)
Nazareth
Rush
UFO
Yes

Bands disbanded

Buffalo Springfield
Cream
Freddie and the Dreamers
Los Speakers
The Righteous Brothers
The Seekers
The Shangri-Las
The Yardbirds (Reformed in 1992)
The Zombies (Reformed in 1991)

Albums released

In the US, 6,540 pop singles and 4,057 albums were released.

January

February

March

April

May

June

July

August

September

October

November

December

Release date unknown

3 in the Attic – Chad & Jeremy
30 by Ella – Ella Fitzgerald
Accent on Africa – Cannonball Adderley
Action! – Desmond Dekker & the Aces
Action – Oscar Peterson
Agemo's Trip to Mother Earth – Group 1850
Aerial Ballet – Harry Nilsson
Afro-Harping – Dorothy Ashby
All of Us – Nirvana
Alto Summit – Lee Konitz
The Amazing New Electronic Pop Sound of Jean Jacques Perrey – Jean-Jacques Perrey
The Archies – The Archies
As If It Were the Seasons – Joseph Jarman
At It Again – The Dubliners
Autumn – Don Ellis
Baby, Come Back – The Equals
Backstage – Cher
Baiyina (The Clear Evidence) – Pat Martino
Balaklava – Pearls Before Swine
A Banda Tropicalista do Duprat – Rogério Duprat
Bang, Bang You're Terry Reid – Terry Reid
The Beat Goes On! – Sonny Criss
Bend Me, Shape Me – The American Breed
Bill Evans at the Montreux Jazz Festival – Bill Evans
Bill Haley's Biggest Hits – Bill Haley & His Comets
Black Magic – Magic Sam
Blue Odyssey – Houston Person
Blues – The Common Ground – Kenny Burrell
Blues on Top of Blues – B. B. King
Bobbie Gentry and Glen Campbell – Bobbie Gentry and Glen Campbell
Bobby Taylor & The Vancouvers – Bobby Taylor & the Vancouvers
The Bonniwell Music Machine – The Music Machine
Boppin' & Burnin' – Don Patterson
The Bottom of the Blues – Otis Spann
Bottoms Up – Illinois Jacquet
The Bright, the Blue and the Beautiful – Ahmad Jamal
Bull's Eye! – Barry Harris
Caetano Veloso – Caetano Veloso
Calling Out Loud – Nat Adderley
Caravan – Caravan
The Cheerful Insanity of Giles, Giles and Fripp – Giles, Giles and Fripp
Come Out Fighting Ghengis Smith – Roy Harper
Congliptious – Roscoe Mitchell
Count Your Blessings, Woman – Jan Howard
Country Girl – Dottie West
Country Hall of Fame – Hank Locklin
The Crazy World of Arthur Brown – The Crazy World of Arthur Brown
Cream of the Crop – Wanda Jackson
Cry Like a Baby – The Box Tops
Cycles – Frank Sinatra
D-I-V-O-R-C-E – Tammy Wynette
The Delta Sweete – Bobbie Gentry
Devil Got My Woman – Skip James
Dino Valente – Dino Valente
Dion – Dion DiMucci
Dirty Grape – Johnny "Hammond" Smith
Disposable – The Deviants
Down Here on the Ground – Wes Montgomery
Drinkin' and Courtin' – The Dubliners
Earth Opera – Earth Opera
Easy Does It – Julie London
Eden's Children – Eden's Children
The Electricfying Eddie Harris – Eddie Harris
Elmer Gantry's Velvet Opera – Elmer Gantry's Velvet Opera
Fall Out – Terry Smith
Feelings – The Grass Roots
Filles de Kilimanjaro – Miles Davis
First Edition's 2nd – The First Edition
For the Sake of the Song – Townes Van Zandt
Francis A. & Edward K. – Frank Sinatra and Duke Ellington
From St. Louie to Frisco – Chuck Berry
Gal Costa – Gal Costa
Gentle on My Mind – Patti Page
Gentle On My Mind and Other Originals – John Hartford
God Bless the Red Krayola and All Who Sail With It – Red Krayola
Goin' to Memphis – Paul Revere & the Raiders
Golden Grass – The Grass Roots
Gun – Gun
H. P. Lovecraft II – H. P. Lovecraft
Heart of Cash – Johnny Cash
Here Comes The Judge – Frederick Earl "Shorty" Long
Hey Little One – Glen Campbell
Hickory Holler Revisited – O.C. Smith
Honey – Andy Williams
The Horse – Cliff Nobles & Co.
Housing Project – John Hartford
I Can't Stop Dancing – Archie Bell & The Drells
I Stand Alone – Al Kooper
I'm a Fool to Want You – Sergio Franchi
In My Own Dream – Paul Butterfield
In New York – Ravi Shankar
It Crawled into My Hand, Honest – The Fugs
It's All About – Spooky Tooth
Karyobin – Spontaneous Music Ensemble
Large as Life and Twice as Natural – Davey Graham
The Left Banke Too – The Left Banke
Live – The 13th Floor Elevators
The Love Album – John Hartford
Look to Your Heart – Perry Como
Love Is All Around – The Troggs
Love and Other Crimes – Lee Hazlewood
Love is Blue – The Lawrence Welk Orchestra
Lucille – B. B. King
A Man Without Love – Engelbert Humperdinck
Members, Don't Git Weary – Max Roach
The Midnight Mover – Wilson Pickett
Miracle Mirror – Golden Earring
Mony Mony – Tommy James and the Shondells
A Morning Raga / An Evening Raga – Ravi Shankar
Nancy & Lee – Nancy Sinatra & Lee Hazlewood
NBC-TV Special:TCB Soundtrack – Diana Ross & The Supremes with The Temptations'Nuff Said! – Nina SimoneOn Stage – Bill Haley & His CometsOne to Get Ready, Four to Go – Clare FischerOtis Redding Live at the Whiskey A Go Go – Otis ReddingOutrageous – Kim FowleyThe Perry Como Christmas Album – Perry ComoPower of Love – Hour GlassThe Progressive Blues Experiment – Johnny WinterPromise Of A Future – Hugh MasekelaRare Junk – Nitty Gritty Dirt BandReality Is Bad Enough – Patrick SkyRealization – Johnny RiversRecital na Boite Barroco – Maria BethâniaRhinoceros – RhinocerosRing Out Joy – Ed SummerlinRoots – The Everly BrothersS.F. Sorrow – The Pretty ThingsScratching the Surface – The Groundhogs (debut)Shake! – Siegel-Schwall BandSir John Alot of Merry Englandes Musyk Thynge and ye Grene Knyghte – John RenbournSlow Drag – Donald ByrdSoul Master – Edwin StarrSoulful Christmas – James BrownThe Sounds of India – Ravi ShankarSoul Limbo – Booker T. & the MGsSpeak Like a Child – Herbie HancockSpecial Occasion – Smokey Robinson & The MiraclesStrictly Personal – Captain Beefheart and his Magic BandSu piano y su música – Armando ManzaneroSwitched-On Bach – Walter CarlosTaj Mahal – Taj MahalLe temps des fleurs – DalidaTenderness Junction – The FugsTexas in My Soul – Willie NelsonThere Is – The DellsThere Goes My Everything – Don CherryTighten Up – Archie Bell & The DrellsTiny Tim's 2nd Album – Tiny TimTomorrow – TomorrowThe Transformed Man – William ShatnerVigil – The EasybeatsWake Up...It's Tomorrow – Strawberry Alarm ClockWelcome to Trini Country – Trini LopezWine and Song – Sergio FranchiWith Their New Face On – The Spencer Davis GroupThe World in a Sea Shell – Strawberry Alarm Clock

Billboard Top popular records of 1968

The 1968 Billboard year-end list is composed of records that entered the Billboard Hot 100 during November-December 1967 (only when the majority of chart weeks were in 1968), January to November-December 1968 (majority of chart weeks in 1968). Records with majority of chart weeks in 1967 or 1969 are included in the year-end charts for those years, respectively, and multiple appearances are not permitted. Each week thirty points were awarded to the number one record, then nineteen points for number two, eighteen points for number three, and so on. The total points a record earned determined its year-end rank. The complete chart life of each record is represented. There are no ties, even when multiple records have the same number of points. The next ranking category is peak chart position, then weeks at peak chart position, weeks in top ten, weeks in top forty, and finally weeks on Hot 100 chart.

The chart can be sorted by Artist, Song title, Recording and Release dates, Cashbox year-end ranking (CB) or units sold (sales) by clicking on the column header. Additional details for each record can be accessed by clicking on the song title, and referring to the Infobox in the right column of the song page. Billboard also has chart summaries on its website. Cashbox rankings were derived by same process as the Billboard rankings. Sales information was derived from the RIAA's Gold and Platinum database, the BRIT Certified database  and The Book of Golden Discs, but numbers listed should be regarded as estimates. Grammy Hall of Fame and National Recording Registry information with sources can be found on Wikipedia. 

Other hit singles

"2 in 3" – Esther & Abi Ofarim
"Ain't Got No, I Got Life"/"Do What You Gotta Do" – Nina Simone
"Ain't No Way" – Aretha Franklin
"Ain't Nothin' but a Houseparty" – The Showstoppers
"Ain't Nothing Like the Real Thing" – Marvin Gaye & Tammi Terrell
"All Along the Watchtower" – The Jimi Hendrix Experience
"Albatross" – Fleetwood Mac
"Am I That Easy to Forget" – Engelbert Humperdinck
"Anything" – Eric Burdon & The Animals
"Baby Come Back" – The Equals
"The Ballad of Bonnie and Clyde" – Georgie Fame
"Bend Me, Shape Me" – The American Breed
"Bend Me, Shape Me" – Amen Corner
"Blue Eyes" – Don Partridge
"Both Sides Now" – Judy Collins
"Breakin' Down the Walls of Heartache" – The Bandwagon
"Cab Driver" – The Mills Brothers
"California Dreamin'" – Bobby Womack
"Can't Take My Eyes Off You" – Andy Williams
"Captain of Your Ship" – Reparata and the Delrons
"Classical Gas" – Mason Williams
"Cloud Nine" – The Temptations
"Congratulations" – Cliff Richard
"Dance to the Music" – Sly & the Family Stone
"Darlin'" – The Beach Boys
"A Day Without Love" – Love Affair
"Days" – The Kinks
"Delilah" – Tom Jones
"Do It Again" – The Beach Boys
"Do You Know the Way to San Jose" – Dionne Warwick
"Du sollst nicht weinen" – Heintje
"Eloise" – Barry Ryan
"Everlasting Love" – Love Affair
"Everything I Am" – Plastic Penny
"Feliciano! – Jose Feliciano
"Fire!" – The Crazy World of Arthur Brown
"Fire Brigade" – The Move
"Fool on the Hill" – Sergio Mendes & Brasil '66
"Girl Watcher" – The O'Kaysions
"Going Up the Country" – Canned Heat
"Grazing in the Grass" – Hugh Masekela
"Gimme Little Sign" – Brenton Wood
"Help Yourself" – Tom Jones
"Helule Helule" – The Tremeloes
"High in the Sky – Amen Corner
"Hold Me Tight" – Johnny Nash
"The House That Jack Built" – Aretha Franklin
"Hurdy Gurdy Man" – Donovan
"Hush" – Deep Purple
"The Horse" – Cliff Nobles & Co.
"I Can Take or Leave Your Loving" – Herman's Hermits
"I Close My Eyes and Count to Ten" – Dusty Springfield
"I Don't Want Our Loving to Die" – The Herd
"I Love You" – People!
"Il est cinq heures, Paris s'éveille" – Jacques Dutronc
"I Pretend" – Des O'Connor
"I Wish It Would Rain" – The Temptations
"I'll Love You Forever Today" – Cliff Richard
"I'm a Tiger" – Lulu
"I'm the Urban Spaceman" – Bonzo Dog Doo-Dah Band
"I've Gotta Be Me" – Sammy Davis, Jr.
"I've Gotta Get a Message to You" – Bee Gees
"Ice in the Sun" – Status Quo
"If I Only Had Time" – John Rowles
"In-A-Gadda-Da-Vida" – Iron Butterfly
"Indian Rope Man" – Julie Driscoll, Brian Auger & The Trinity
"Jennifer Juniper" – Donovan
"Jesamine" – The Casuals
"Journey to the Center of the Mind" – The Amboy Dukes
"Just Dropped In (To See What Condition My Condition Was In)" – The First Edition
"Keep On" – Bruce Channel
"Keep the Ball Rollin'" – Al Hirt
"Lady Madonna" – The Beatles
"Lazy Sunday" – Small Faces
"The Legend of Xanadu" – Dave Dee, Dozy, Beaky, Mick & Tich
"Light My Fire" – Jose Feliciano
"Little Arrows" – Leapy Lee
"Little Green Apples" – Roger Miller
"The Look of Love" – Sergio Mendes & Brasil '66
"Lovin' Things" – Marmalade
"Magic Bus" – The Who
"A Man Without Love" – Engelbert Humperdinck
"Marianne" – Cliff Richard
"Master Jack" – Four Jacks and a Jill
"Mathilda" – Udo Jürgens
"Me the Peaceful Heart" – Lulu
"Midnight Confessions" – The Grass Roots
"Mighty Quinn" – Manfred Mann
"Monterey" – Eric Burdon & The Animals
"Mony Mony" – Tommy James & the Shondells
"Mountain of Love" - Ronnie Dove
"My Little Lady" – The Tremeloes
"My Name is Jack" – Manfred Mann
"My Song" – Aretha Franklin
"Need Your Love So Bad" – Fleetwood Mac
"Ob-La-Di, Ob-La-Da" – The Marmalade
"On the Road Again" – Canned Heat
"Only One Woman" – The Marbles
"Over You" – Gary Puckett & The Union Gap
"Paradise Lost" – The Herd
"Piece of my Heart" – Big Brother and the Holding Company
"Pictures of Matchstick Men" – Status Quo
"Playboy" – Gene & Debbe
"Race with the Devil" – The Gun
"Rainbow Valley" – Love Affair
"Reach out of the Darkness" – Friend & Lover
"Rosie" – Don Partridge
"Say It Loud" – James Brown
"Scarborough Fair" – Sergio Mendes & Brasil '66
"Schlager Rendezvous 1" – Peter Alexander
"See Saw" – Aretha Franklin
"The Silent Sun" – Genesis
"Simon Says" – 1910 Fruitgum Company
"Sky Pilot" – Eric Burdon & The Animals
"Sleepy Joe" – Herman's Hermits
"Slip Away" – Clarence Carter
"Some Velvet Morning" – Lee Hazlewood & Nancy Sinatra
"Son of a Preacher Man" – Dusty Springfield
"Son of Hickory Holler's Tramp" – O. C. Smith
"Soulful Strut" – Young-Holt Unlimited
"Spooky" – Classics IV
"Step Inside Love" – Cilla Black
"Stoned Soul Picnic" – The 5th Dimension
"Suddenly You Love Me" – The Tremeloes
"Summertime" – Big Brother & The Holding Company
"Sunshine Girl" – Herman's Hermits
"Sunshine of Your Love" – Cream
"Suzie Q." – Creedence Clearwater Revival
"Sweet Blindness" – The 5th Dimension
"(Sweet Sweet Baby) Since You've Been Gone" – Aretha Franklin
"Take Time to Know Her" – Percy Sledge
"This Wheel's on Fire" – Julie Driscoll, Brian Auger & The Trinity
"Tiptoe Through the Tulips" – Tiny Tim
"Valleri" – The Monkees
"The Weight" – The Band
"What a Wonderful World" – Louis Armstrong, His Orchestra & Chorus
"White Horses" – Jacky
"White Houses" – Eric Burdon & The Animals
"White Room" – Cream
"A Winter's Tale" – Genesis
"With a Little Help from My Friends" – Joe Cocker
"Yesterday Has Gone" – Cupid's Inspiration
"You Ain't Goin' Nowhere" – The Byrds
"Yummy Yummy Yummy" – The Ohio Express

Published popular music
 "1,2,3, Red Light" w.m. Sal Trimachi and Bobbi Trimachi
 "1432 Franklin Pike Circle Hero" w.m. Bobby Russell
 "Abraham, Martin and John" w.m. Dick Holler
 "Les Bicyclettes de Belsize" w.m. Les Reed & Barry Mason
 "Chitty Chitty Bang Bang" w.m. Richard M. Sherman & Robert B. Sherman from the film of the same name
 "Classical Gas" m. Mason Williams
 "Congratulations" w.m. Bill Martin and Phil Coulter
 "Dear World" w.m. Jerry Herman from the musical Dear World "Eli's Comin'" w.m. Laura Nyro
 "The Fool on the Hill" w.m. John Lennon & Paul McCartney
 "For the Good Times" w.m. Kris Kristofferson
 "Galveston" w.m. Jimmy Webb
 "Heffalumps and Woozles" w.m. Richard M. Sherman & Robert B. Sherman from the film Winnie the Pooh and the Blustery Day "Honey Pie" w.m. John Lennon and Paul McCartney
 "I'll Never Fall in Love Again" w. Hal David m. Burt Bacharach from the musical Promises, Promises "Indian Lake" w.m. Tony Romeo
 "Indian Reservation" w.m. John D. Loudermilk, first recorded by Don Fardon
 "Little Green Apples" w.m. Bobby Russell
 "Mac Arthur Park" w.m. Jimmy Webb
 "Mr. Bojangles" w.m. Jerry Jeff Walker
 "My Way" (French: "Comme d'habitude") w.m. Claude François & Jacques Revaux, Eng.: Paul Anka
 "The Night They Raided Minsky's" w. Lee Adams m. Charles Strouse from the film The Night They Raided Minsky's "A Perfect Gentleman" w. Lee Adams m. Charles Strouse Introduced by Jason Robards and Norman Wisdom in the film The Night They Raided Minsky's "Promises, Promises" w. Hal David m. Burt Bacharach from the musical Promises, Promises "Save The Country" w.m. Laura Nyro
 "Stand By Your Man" w.m. Billy Sherrill & Tammy Wynette
 "Stoned Soul Picnic" w.m. Laura Nyro
 "Sweet Blindness" w.m. Laura Nyro
 "Take Ten Terrific Girls" w. Lee Adams m. Charles Strouse from the film The Night They Raided Minsky's "Ten Feet off the Ground" w.m. Richard M. Sherman & Robert B. Sherman from the film The One and Only, Genuine, Original Family Band "This Guy's In Love With You" w. Hal David m. Burt Bacharach
 "Wichita Lineman" w.m. Jimmy Webb
 "The Windmills of Your Mind" w. Alan Bergman & Marilyn Bergman m. Michel LeGrand from the film The Thomas Crown Affair "The Wonderful Thing About Tiggers" w.m. Richard M. Sherman & Robert B. Sherman from the film Winnie the Pooh and the Blustery Day "You Rat, You" w. Lee Adams m. Charles Strouse from the film The Night They Raided Minsky'sClassical music

Premieres

Compositions
Milton Babbitt – Relata II for orchestra
Henk Badings
Symphony No. 14ArmageddonSamuel Barber – Twelfth Night and To Be Sung on the Water, op. 42
Jean Barraqué –
Concerto, for six instrumental formations and two solo instruments (vibraphone and clarinet)Le Temps restitué for mezzo-soprano, choir, and orchestra
Luciano Berio –O KingSinfoniaChemins IIIQuesto vuol dire che for three female voices, small chorus, tape and other available resources
Carlos Chávez – Pirámide (ballet)
John Corigliano – Piano Concerto
George Crumb – Songs, Drones, and Refrains of Death for baritone, electric guitar, electric double bass, amplified piano/electric harpsichord, and two percussionists
Mario Davidovsky – Music for Solo ViolinPeter Maxwell Davies –Stedman CatersStedman Doubles (revised version)Fantasia on a Ground and 2 Pavans (after Purcell)Epistrophe for two pianosL'homme arméEdison Denisov –Osen′ (Autumn), for 13 solo voicesOda, pamyati Khe Gevara (Ode in Memory of Che Guevara)Romanticheskaya muzïka (Romantic Music)
Cristóbal Halffter –SymposionYes, Speak Out, YesRoy Harris –
Symphony no. 12
Concerto for Amplified Piano, Brass, Double Bass, and Percussion
Sonata for Cello and Piano (revised version)
Hans Werner Henze – Das Floß der MedusaHeinz Holliger – h for wind quintet
Karel Husa – Music for Prague 1968Wojciech Kilar – Training 68 for clarinet, trombone, cello and piano
Ladislav Kupkovic – Souvenir (one of his few recorded works)
Helmut Lachenmann – temA for flute, voice and cello
György Ligeti – Zehn Stücke für Bläserquintett (Ten Pieces for Wind Quintet)
Witold Lutosławski – Livre pour orchestreEster Mägi – SymphonyKrzysztof Meyer – Sonatas for Piano, No. 4
Bo Nilsson – Attraktionen, for string quartet
Per Nørgård –Rejse ind i den gyldne skærm (Voyage into the Golden Screen)Concerto for Accordion RecallArvo Pärt – "Credo" for piano, chorus and orchestra
Krzysztof Penderecki – St Luke Passion (Penderecki)John Serry Sr. – Processional for OrganRoger Sessions – Symphony no. 8
Dmitri Shostakovich –
String Quartet no. 12 in D major, op. 133
Sonata for Violin and Piano in D major, op. 134
Karlheinz Stockhausen –Aus den sieben TagenKurzwellenStimmungSpiralJohn Tavener – The Whale (cantata)
David Tudor & Lowell Cross – ReunionCharles Wuorinen –Flute Variations IIString Trio
Iannis Xenakis – Nomos Gamma for 98 musicians dispersed among the audience

Opera
Benjamin Britten – The Prodigal Son (church parable)
Carlos Chávez – Los visitantes (revision of Panfilo e Lauretta)
Peter Maxwell Davies – Revelation and FallGian Carlo Menotti – Help, Help, the Globolinks!Ástor Piazzolla – María de Buenos AiresJazz

Musical theater
 Cabaret (Kander and Ebb) – London production
 Canterbury Tales     London production
 Dames at Sea     Off-Broadway production opened at the Bouwerie Lane Theatre on December 20 and transferred to the Theatre de Lys on April 22, 1969, for a total run of 575 performances.
 The Dancing Years (Ivor Novello) – London revival
 Darling of the Day (w. E. Y. Harburg m. Jule Styne) Broadway production opened at the George Abbott Theatre on January 27 and ran for 31 performances. Starred Patricia Routledge and Vincent Price
 George M!     Broadway production opened at the Palace Theatre and ran for 433 performances
 Golden Boy     London production
 Golden Rainbow     Broadway production opened at the George Abbott Theatre and ran for 388 performances
 Hair – Broadway (1,750 performances) and London (1,997 performances) productions
 House of Flowers     off-Broadway revival
 Lady, Be Good!     London revival
 Man of La Mancha     London production
 Promises, Promises     Broadway production opened at the Shubert Theatre and ran for 1,281 performances
 The Happy Time Broadway production opened at the Broadway Theatre and ran for 286 performances
 Zorba – after the movie (Zorba the Greek, 1964) and book (Nikos Kazantzakis, 1952).1969 Tony Award for Best Musical and numerous other nominations, 1969 Drama Desk Award for Outstanding Lyrics (to Fred Ebb, the first year of that category) and three other nominations. 305 performances starting 11/16/68 at the Imperial Theatre, NY. (Revival 9/16/83 at the Broadway Theatre, NY, ran 362 performances with 1984 Theatre World Award to actor Robert Westenberg.)

Musical films
 Aashirwad Bhagyamudra Les Bicyclettes de Belsize Chitty Chitty Bang Bang Finian's Rainbow Funny Girl Head – starring The Monkees and written by Jack Nicholson.
 The Jungle Book – animated feature film
 Monterey Pop The Night They Raided Minsky's – released December 22 starring Jason Robards and Britt Ekland
 Oliver! The One and Only, Genuine, Original Family Band Star! Yellow Submarine – animated feature film

Births
January 9 – Al Schnier, American rock guitarist
January 11 – Tom Dumont, American guitarist
January 14 – LL Cool J, American rapper and actor
January 19 – Ikuko Kawai, Japanese classic violinist and composer
January 27
Mike Patton, American alternative metal vocalist and producer (Faith No More)
Deb Talan, American singer-songwriter and guitarist (The Weepies)
Tricky, English rapper and songwriter
January 28
Sarah McLachlan, Canadian singer-songwriter
DJ Muggs, American trip hop musician (Cypress Hill)
February 1 – Lisa Marie Presley, American singer-songwriter (daughter of Elvis and Priscilla Presley) (died 2023)
February 4 – Marko Matvere, Estonian actor and singer
February 5 – Chris Barron, American alternative rock singer-songwriter (Spin Doctors)
February 7 – Sully Erna, American singer-songwriter and guitarist (Godsmack and Meliah Rage)
February 12
Gregory Charles, Canadian singer, dancer, pianist and actor
Chynna Phillips, American pop singer (Wilson Phillips) and actress (daughter of John & Michelle Phillips of the Mamas & the Papas)
February 19 – Stochelo Rosenberg, Dutch Gypsy jazz guitarist
February 22 – Brad Nowell, American ska punk musician (Sublime) (died 1996)
February 25
Evridiki, Cypriot singer
Oumou Sangaré, Malian Wassoulou singer
March 4 – Patsy Kensit, British actress and singer
March 8 – Shawn Mullins, American singer-songwriter
March 11 – Lisa Loeb, American singer-songwriter
March 15
Kahimi Karie, Japanese singer
Mark McGrath, American rock singer (Sugar Ray) and television presenter
Jon Schaffer, American heavy metal guitarist and singer-songwriter (Iced Earth)
March 23 – Damon Albarn, British singer (Blur and Gorillaz)
March 26
Kenny Chesney, American country singer
James Iha, American alternative rock guitarist (The Smashing Pumpkins)
March 29 – Lucy Lawless, New Zealand born singer and actress
March 30 – Céline Dion, Canadian singer-songwriter
April 1 – Julia Boutros, Lebanese singer
April 3 – Sebastian Bach (Sebastian Philip Bierk), Canadian-born heavy metal singer (Skid Row)
April 9 – Cutfather, Danish music producer, songwriter, DJ and remixer
April 12 – Toby Gad, Los Angeles based German singer-songwriter/music producer (The Veronicas, Madonna, Leona Lewis, Hilary Duff)
April 16 – Boudewijn Vincent Bonebakker, Dutch rock guitarist (Gorefest)
April 28 – Howard Donald, British singer and dancer (Take That)
April 29 – Carnie Wilson, pop singer (Wilson Phillips), daughter of Brian Wilson
May 1 – D'arcy Wretzky (The Smashing Pumpkins)
May 16 – Ralph Tresvant (New Edition)
May 28 – Kylie Minogue, Australian singer, songwriter, actress, dancer, music producer and philanthropist
June 1 – Jason Donovan, Australian actor and singer
June 6 – Alan Licht, American guitarist, composer and journalist (Run On)
June 10 – The D.O.C., African-American rapper
June 12 – Bobby Sheehan (Blues Traveler)
June 13
David Gray, British folk rock singer-songwriter
Denise Pearson, British singer (Five Star)
June 30 – Phil Anselmo (Pantera)
July 4 – Jack Frost, American guitarist and songwriter (Seven Witches and The Bronx Casket Co.)
July 5 – Nardwuar the Human Serviette, Canadian singer-songwriter and keyboard player (The Evaporators)
July 10 – Claudia Pop, Romanian soprano and opera stage director, Doctor in Music, senior lecturer
July 16 – Olga Souza ("Corona"), Brazilian singer and dancer
July 19 – Robert Flynn, American musician
July 22 – Rhys Ifans, actor, previously vocalist with Super Furry Animals
July 24 – Kristin Chenoweth, American actress and singer
July 30 – Elvis Crespo, Puerto Rican singer
August 1 – Dan Donegan, American rock musician (Disturbed)
August 2 – John Stanier, American drummer (Helmet, Tomahawk, The Mark of Cain and Battles)
August 10 – Michael Bivins, New Edition, Bell Biv Devoe
August 11 – Charlie Sexton, American guitarist, singer and songwriter
August 12 – Paul Tucker, British musician (Lighthouse Family)
August 21 – Dina Carroll, British singer
August 25 – Stuart Murdoch, Scottish singer, songwriter and guitarist (Belle and Sebastian)
September 10 – Big Daddy Kane, American rapper
September 11 – Kay Hanley (Letters To Cleo)
September 12 – Ler LaLonde (Primus, Possessed)
September 13 – Mike Davenport (The Ataris)
September 21 – David Jude Jolicoeur aka Trugoy the Dove, American rapper and record producer (De La Soul) (died 2023)
September 25
 Will Smith, American rapper, actor, producer, comedian and singer-songwriter (DJ Jazzy Jeff & The Fresh Prince, DJ Jazzy Jeff, The Fresh Prince of Bel-Air)
 Catherine Zeta-Jones, Welsh-born actress, singer and dancer
October 1
Kevin Griffin (Better Than Ezra)
Sagol 59, Israeli rapper
October 3 – Sevil Hajiyeva, Azerbaijani singer
October 5 – Nana, rapper
October 6 – Dominique A, French singer-songwriter
October 7 – Thom Yorke, British musician (Radiohead)
October 8 – CL Smooth, African-American rapper
October 11 – Jane Krakowski, American actress and singer
October 12 – Hugh Jackman, Australian actor, dancer and singer
October 14 – Johnny Goudie, American musician
October 17 – Ziggy Marley, Jamaican reggae artist
October 17 – Alejandra Ávalos, Mexican musician and actress
October 19 – Rodney Carrington, American stand-up comic and country musician
October 22 – Shaggy, Jamaican-American reggae & dancehall singer
October 30 – Kiyoharu, Japanese singer-songwriter
November 9 – Nazzareno Carusi, Italian pianist
November 10 – Steve Brookstein, British singer
November 11 – David L Cook, Christian music singer and comedian
November 14 – Ken Ford, jazz violinist
November 15
Jennifer Charles, American singer
Ol' Dirty Bastard, American rapper (died 2004)
November 21 – Alex James, British bassist (Blur)
November 25 – Tunde Baiyewu, British singer (Lighthouse Family)
November 28 – Dawn Robinson, American singer (En Vogue)
November 29
Martin Carr (Boo Radleys)
Jonathan Knight, American singer (New Kids on the Block)
December 2
 Lucy Liu, American actress, director, film producer, singer and artist
 Nate Mendel (Foo Fighters)
December 9 – Brian Bell (Weezer)
December 16 – Lalah Hathaway, American singer and daughter of Donny Hathaway
December 20 – Billy Mann, American songwriter, record producer, creative executive, music publisher and founder/CEO (P1Nk, Delta Goodrem, Cher, Robyn)
December 29 – Glen Phillips (Toad the Wet Sprocket)

Deaths
January 18 – Gribouille, French singer, 26 (alcohol and drug-related)
February 5 – Luckey Roberts, ragtime composer and pianist, 80
February 13
Ildebrando Pizzetti, composer, 87
Portia White, contralto singer, 56
February 15 – Little Walter, blues singer and harmonica player, 37
February 27 – Frankie Lymon, American singer, 25 (heroin overdose)
February 28 – Doretta Morrow, dancer, 40 (cancer)
March 6 – Iša Krejčí, composer and conductor, 63
March 10 – Blind Joe Reynolds, singer-songwriter
March 16 – Mario Castelnuovo-Tedesco, composer, 72
April 15 – Borys Lyatoshynsky, composer, 73
April 25 – Harald Kreutzberg, dancer and choreographer, 65
May 15 – Florence Austral, operatic soprano, 76
May 19 – Coleman Hawkins, jazz musician, 64
May 24 – Bernard Rogers, composer, 75
May 26 – Little Willie John, blues artist, 30 (heart attack)
June 2 – André Mathieu, pianist and composer, 39
June 8 – Bumble Bee Slim, blues musician, 63
June 14 – Karl-Birger Blomdahl, composer and conductor, 51
June 15 – Wes Montgomery, jazz guitarist, 45 (heart attack)
June 26 – Ziggy Elman, US trumpet player, 54
July 21 – Ruth St. Denis, dancer, 89
July 27 – Lilian Harvey, actress and singer, 62
July 28 – Carl Ravazza, US violinist, vocalist and bandleader, 58
July 30 – Jón Leifs, composer, 69
August 5 – Luther Perkins, guitarist of The Tennessee Two, 40 (burns and smoke inhalation following a house fire)
August 15 – Luis Gianneo, Argentine composer, pianist and conductor, 71
August 18 – Arthur Marshall, ragtime composer, 86
September 19 – Red Foley, country singer, 58
October 8 – Frank Skinner, film composer, 70
October 15 – Franz Reizenstein, pianist and composer, 57
October 20 – Bud Flanagan, music hall star, 72
October 30 – Pops Foster, jazz musician, 77
November 6 – Charles Munch, conductor, 77 (heart attack)
November 8 – Kokomo Arnold, blues musician, 67
November 9 – Jan Johansson, jazz pianist, 37 (car crash)
November 11 – Jeanne Demessieux, organist, pianist and composer, 47 (embolism)
December 1 – Nicolae Bretan, composer, 81
December 9 – Percy Greenbank, lyricist, 90
December 14 – Margarete Klose, operatic mezzo-soprano, 69
December 19 – Tiberiu Brediceanu, composer, 91
December 31 – Sabin Drăgoi, composer, 74date unknown''
Juan F. Acosta, composer and music teacher
Lucille Dompierre, pianist and arranger
Billy Pigg, bagpiper
Vincenzo Scaramuzza, pianist

Awards

Grammy Awards
Grammy Awards of 1968

Eurovision Song Contest
Eurovision Song Contest 1968

References 

 
20th century in music
Music by year